Erik Agard is a crossword solver, constructor, and editor. He is the winner of the 2018 American Crossword Puzzle Tournament (ACPT), the crossword editor at USA Today, a crossword setter for The New Yorker, and a former Jeopardy! contestant. 

He was described by the Washington Post as "the nation's top teen crossword puzzle solver." He has been celebrated for helping to increase diversity and inclusion in crosswords: the puzzles that he edits at USA Today are primarily constructed by women and people of color, and contain references to pieces of media and culture that other mainstream outlets do not consider "standard knowledge." For instance, the February 19, 2022 crossword puzzle contained the clue ["you're telling me a cis ___ built this chapel?" (@RileyJohnSavage tweet)] for the entry TEEN. 

During his appearance on Jeopardy!, his use of a meme in answer to a question gained widespread notice. After beating 5-time champion Alan Dunn, he won 3 times won $66,802 (not including compensation).

References

External links 
 Erik Agard's Crosswords at the New Yorker

Crossword compilers
Jeopardy! contestants
USA Today people
The New Yorker people
Year of birth missing (living people)
Living people